The Europe Zone was one of the four zones within Group 3 of the regional Davis Cup competition in 2017. The zone's competition was held in round robin format in Sozopol, Bulgaria, in April 2017. The two winning groups advanced to Europe/Africa Zone Group II in 2018.

Participating nations

Inactive nation

Draw
Date: 5–8 April 2017

Location: Holiday Village Santa Marina, Sozopol, Bulgaria (hard)

Format: Round-robin basis. One pool of three teams (Pool A) and three pools of four teams (Pools B, C and D). The winners of each pool play-off against each other to determine which two nations are promoted to Europe/Africa Zone Group II in 2018.

Seeding: The seeding was based on the Davis Cup Rankings of 20 February 2017 (shown in parentheses below).

* Tie broken by drawing of lot.

Pool A

Pool B

Pool C

Pool D

Playoffs 

 and  promoted to Group II in 2018.

Round robin

Pool A

Bulgaria vs. Armenia

Greece vs. Armenia

Bulgaria vs. Greece

Pool B

Moldova vs. Iceland

Macedonia vs. Malta

Moldova vs. Malta

Macedonia vs. Iceland

Moldova vs. Macedonia

Iceland vs. Malta

Pool C

Luxembourg vs. San Marino

Liechtenstein vs. Albania

Luxembourg vs. Albania

Liechtenstein vs. San Marino

Luxembourg vs. Liechtenstein

San Marino vs. Albania

Pool D

Ireland vs. Andorra

Montenegro vs. Kosovo

Ireland vs. Kosovo

Montenegro vs. Andorra

Ireland vs. Montenegro

Andorra vs. Kosovo

Playoffs

Promotional playoffs

Bulgaria vs. Ireland

Macedonia vs. Luxembourg

5th to 8th place playoffs

Greece vs. Montenegro

Moldova vs. Liechtenstein

9th to 12th place playoffs

Armenia vs. Andorra

Malta vs. Albania

13th to 14th playoff

Iceland vs. San Marino

References

External links
Official Website

Europe Zone Group III
Davis Cup Europe/Africa Zone